In enzymology, a nucleotide diphosphatase is an enzyme that catalyzes the chemical reaction

a dinucleotide + H2O  2 mononucleotides

Thus, the two substrates of this enzyme are dinucleotide and H2O, whereas its product is mononucleotide.

This enzyme belongs to the family of hydrolases, specifically those acting on acid anhydrides in phosphorus-containing anhydrides.  The systematic name of this enzyme class is dinucleotide nucleotidohydrolase. Other names in common use include nucleotide pyrophosphatase, and nucleotide-sugar pyrophosphatase.  This enzyme participates in 5 metabolic pathways: purine metabolism, starch and sucrose metabolism, riboflavin metabolism, nicotinate and nicotinamide metabolism, and pantothenate and coa biosynthesis.

Structural studies

References

 
 
 
 

EC 3.6.1
Enzymes of known structure